Geneva Gay is an American academic and author. She is an emerita professor at the University of Washington-Seattle.

Biography 
Gay is a consultant for the Teaching Diverse Students initiative through Learning For Justice, a project of the Southern Poverty Law Center. In 1994, Gay was the first recipient of The G. Pritchy Smith Multicultural Educator Award given by the National Association for Multicultural Education.

The American Educational Research Association awarded Gay the Distinguished Scholar Award in 1990.

Selected publications 

 2nd ed., 2010; 3rd ed., 2018.

References

See also 

 

Year of birth missing (living people)
Living people
American educators
American education writers
University of Washington faculty